Peking Express is a Dutch–Flemish reality game show that follows a series of couples as they hitchhike to or from Beijing (only in the first three seasons; seasons four and five are set in South America). The series, first broadcast on 14 March 2004, ran for seven seasons from 2004 to 2008 and was revived in 2012 (as a sole Dutch production) and again in 2017. In the Netherlands, it was screened by Net 5 and in Belgium by VT4 during its original 2000s run before moving to Q2 in 2017. The concept has also been sold to a number of countries around the world since 2005.

General theme
The theme of the show is to demonstrate how various couples deal with the challenges and pitfalls of attempting a long-distance hitchhike to a strange city, together with all the difficulties presented by trying to communicate in a language they don't understand. Tension was added by including couples who had broken up "in real life", but were willing to work together for the sake of winning the race.

In somewhat similar fashion to The Amazing Race, couples that come in last at various checkpoints along the way are eliminated from further competition. In the second series, each of the couples was given €1 per person/per day as their stipend along the route.

Theme music
The music used during the opening sequence is "Summon the Worms" from Brian Tyler's soundtrack to the 2003 miniseries Frank Herbert's Children of Dune.

Winning couples in the international versions

Africa

Moroccan seasons

America

Colombian seasons

Mexican season

Europe

Belgium/Netherlands seasons

Denmark/Sweden/Norway seasons

French seasons

German seasons

Greek seasons
In this version, there are only celebrity couples.

Hungarian seasons
In this version, there are mainly Hungarian VIP couples.

Italian seasons
In this version, there are mainly VIP couples.

Polish seasons
In this version, there are only celebrity couples.

Romanian seasons
In this version, there are only celebrity couples.

Spanish seasons

International versions
A German version was shown in 2005. The concept has also been sold to Scandinavia where it was broadcast for the first time in the autumn of 2007. The Scandinavian version is shown on Kanal 5 in Sweden, TVNorge in Norway and Kanal 5 in Denmark.

A French version named Pékin Express is screened by M6, with twelve seasons aired so far from 2006 to 2019, and a thirteen and fourteen planned for 2020. It can be seen on TV5 outside France. In Spain, the first four seasons of local version Pekín Express aired on Cuatro from 2008 to 2011; Atresmedia acquired the rights in 2015 and has produced two seasons since. An Italian version has been produced since 2012 by RAI and shown on Rai 2 successfully.

In Poland, the series has been broadcast on TVN since 2016 and was known for its first two seasons, which were set in Asia, as Azja Express. From season 3 onwards, it has been known as Ameryka Express, with its production location changing to America; a fourth season premiered in spring 2020. In Romania, the series has aired successfully on Antena 1 since 2018 as Asia Express for its first four seasons, with the upcoming season being titled America Express, following the changing of its production location into Americas. In Greece, the series has started airing on Star Channel as Asia Express in fall 2022.

References

External links

2004 Dutch television series debuts
2017 Dutch television series endings
Dutch game shows
Hitchhiking
Net5 original programming
Play4 (TV channel) original programming
Reality television series franchises